An energy budget is a balance sheet of energy income against expenditure. It is studied in the field of Energetics which deals with the study of energy transfer and transformation from one form to another.  Calorie is the basic unit of measurement. An organism in a laboratory experiment is an open thermodynamic system, exchanging energy with its surroundings in three ways - heat, work and the potential energy of biochemical compounds.

Organisms use ingested food resources (C=consumption) as building blocks in the synthesis of tissues (P=production) and as fuel in the metabolic process that power this synthesis and other physiological processes (R=respiratory loss). Some of the resources are lost as waste products (F=faecal loss, U=urinary loss). All these aspects of metabolism can be represented in energy units. The basic model of energy budget may be shown as:

P = C - R - U - F or 

P = C - (R + U + F) or 

C = P + R + U + F 

All the aspects of metabolism can be represented in energy units (e.g. joules (J);1 calorie = 4.2 kJ).
Energy used for metabolism will be

R = C - (F + U + P) 

Energy used in the maintenance will be

R + F + U = C - P

Endothermy and ectothermy 
Energy budget allocation varies for endotherms and ectotherms. Ectotherms rely on the environment as a heat source while endotherms maintain their body temperature through the regulation of metabolic processes. The heat produced in association with metabolic processes facilitates the active lifestyles of endotherms and their ability to travel far distances over a range of temperatures in the search for food. Ectotherms are limited by the ambient temperature of the environment around them but the lack of substantial metabolic heat production accounts for an energetically inexpensive metabolic rate. The energy demands for ectotherms are generally one tenth of that required for endotherms.

References

 Kumar, Ranjan (1999): Studies on Bioenergics modelling in a fresh water fish, Mystus vittatus (Bloch), Ph.D thesis, Magadh University, Bodh Gaya.
 B.R. Braaten (1976): Bioenergetics - a review on Methodology. In: Halver J. E. and K. Tiews (eds). Finfish nutrition and Finfish Technology vol. II, pp. 461–504. Berlin, Hennemann.
 Brett, J. R. (1962) and T. D. D. Groves (1979): Physiological energetics. In: W.S. Hoar, D.J. Randall and J. R. Brett(eds). In: Fish Physiology, Vol VII. PP.279–352. N.Y,; A.P.
 Cui, Y and R. J. Wootton (1988): Bioenergetics of growth of a cyprinid Phoxinus phoxinus : the effect of ration, temperature, and body size on food consumption, faecal and nitrogen excretion. J. Fish. Biol, 33: 431-443.
 Elliott, J.M. and L. Persson (1978): The estimation of daily rate of food consumption for fish. J. Anim. Ecol. 47,977.
 Fischer, Z (1983): The elements of energy balance in grass carp (Ctenophayngodon idella) part-IV, consumption rate of grass carp fed on different types of food.
 Kerr, S.R. (1982): Estimating the energy budgets of actively predatory fish. Can. J.Fish Aqual. Sci, 39-371.
 Kleiber, M. (1961): The fire of life - An Introduction to animal Energetics. Wiley, New York
 Prabhakar, A. K. (1997): Studies on energy budget in a siluroid fish, Heteropneustes fossilis (Bloch), Ph.D thesis, Magadh University, Bodh Gaya.
 Ray, A. K and B. C. Patra (1987): Method for collecting fish faeces for studying the digestibility of feeds J. Inland. Fish Soc. India. 19 (I) 71-73. 
 Sengupta, A. and Amitta Moitra (1996): Energy Budget in relation to various dietary conditions in snake headed murrel, Channa punctatus: Proc. 83rd ISCA: ABS No. 95: pp. 56.
 Staples, D.J. and M. Nomura (1976): Influence of body size and food ration on the energy budget of rainbow trout, Salmo gairdneri (Rechardson). J. Fish Biol. 9, 29.
 Von Bertalanfly, L. (1957): Quantitative law in Metabolism. Quartz. Rev. biol. 32: 217-231
Warren, C.E. and G.E. Davies (1967): Laboratory studies on the feeding bioenergetics and growth of fish. In: Gerking, S.D. (eds). The biological basis for freshwater Fish Production. pp. 175–214. Oxford, Blackwell.

Budgets
Biology